Ian Kane Jomha (né Washburn; born October 1, 1990), known online as iDubbbz, is an American YouTube personality. Creator of YouTube channels iDubbbzTV, iDubbbzTV2, and iDubbbzgames, he is best known for his comedy video series, including Content Cop, Bad Unboxing and Kickstarter Crap, his collaborations with numerous other creators and recent foray into boxing and documentary filmmaking. His 2017 diss track "Asian Jake Paul" charted and peaked at number 24 on Billboard's US R&B/HH Digital Song Sales chart.

Career 
iDubbbz has been credited for making several videos and cameos that became Internet memes.

Content Cop 
iDubbbz's Content Cop series highlights other YouTube channels, critiquing their content as well as their owner's behavior on social media. From December 2015 to October 2017, iDubbbz released Content Cop episodes on a wide variety of YouTube personalities, including LeafyIsHere, Tana Mongeau, and RiceGum.

In May 2016, iDubbbz released a Content Cop video on Daniel Keem, better known as Keemstar, and his channel DramaAlert. According to The Daily Beast, iDubbbz accused Keemstar of using DramaAlert to "promote his friends and punish his enemies". In response, Keem called the Content Cop video "entertaining" and denied wanting to attack other YouTubers, saying he has "no problem booking guests or landing exclusive interviews".

In October 2017, iDubbbz uploaded a video titled "Content Cop – Jake Paul", which has over 50 million views as of May 2021. However, the 31-minute video was not about the YouTube personality Jake Paul, instead it was about RiceGum. in the video, iDubbbz analyzes and critiques RiceGum in a format inspired by the seven deadly sins. Released along with the Content Cop episode, iDubbbz released a music video for a diss track of RiceGum titled "Asian Jake Paul", which featured Boyinaband. The song has over 85 million views as of August 2021. The song peaked at number 24 on the R&B/Hip-hop Digital Song Sales chart. RiceGum responded with several videos, including "Frick Da Police", a response diss track, and a 22-minute video response. iDubbbz responded with a follow-up video titled "Content Deputy – AJP" rebutting RiceGum's responses, featuring a comedic cameo by rapper Post Malone, and stating that this would be his final response to the situation.

In late 2019, three years after Ian's Content Cop episode on LeafyIsHere, YouTube removed the video as a consequence of the website's updated policies on harassment and bullying.

OnlyFans controversy
In March 2020, many of iDubbbz's fans took to social media after his girlfriend, Anisa Jomha, announced her "lewd" OnlyFans on Twitter. Responding to the remarks of fans accusing him of being a simp, he stated, "I love my girlfriend, and I'm totally fine with it. It doesn't affect me. If you are upset by me admitting this, then I suggest you go idolize someone else."

Creator Clash

In January 2022, iDubbbz announced Creator Clash, a celebrity boxing charity event that took place on May 14, 2022. Notable participants included Doctor Mike, Harley Morenstein from Epic Meal Time, Arin "Egoraptor" Hanson from Game Grumps, along with Matt Watson, Nathan Barnatt, TheOdd1sOut, I did a thing, and Michael Reeves. It was later announced that streamers Esfand and Cr1TiKaL would join as interviewer and color commentator respectively. On May 14, the event was held at the Yuengling Center in Tampa, Florida, and was also livestreamed.

Personal life 
He attended California State University San Marcos and graduated with a bachelor's degree in Business Management. Although his parents encouraged him to get a job, by the time he had graduated his YouTube channel had grown to the point where it became economically viable to pursue it as a full-time career.

In April 2021, iDubbbz and his girlfriend Anisa Jomha announced their engagement. They married in June 2021, with iDubbbz's last name changed from Washburn to Jomha.

Discography

Singles

Boxing record

See also 
List of YouTubers

Notes

References 

1990 births
Living people
American YouTubers
Comedy YouTubers
Internet memes
Twitch (service) streamers
People from San Antonio
Surreal comedy
YouTube boxers
YouTube channels launched in 2012
YouTube controversies